Sergey Orestovich Beseda (Russian: Сергей Орестович Беседа; born on 17 May 1954) is a Russian politician, Colonel General and government agent who has headed the Fifth Service (Service of Operational Information and International Relations) of Russia's Federal Security Service (FSB) internal intelligence agency since 2009.

In March 2022, during the first month of Russia's invasion of Ukraine, international media reported that Beseda was being held under house arrest as a consequence of giving Russian President Vladimir Putin erroneous intelligence on unexpectedly strong Ukrainian resistance to the invasion. On 8 April, Beseda was reportedly transferred to Moscow's Lefortovo Prison, but Russian authorities provided no official confirmation of any of these events and in August The Washington Post cast doubt on reports that Beseda had been removed from his leadership role at the FSB.

Early life

Sergey Beseda was born on 17 May 1954.

Career
In 2003, Beseda was named FSB Deputy Head of Department - Head of the Directorate for Coordination of Operational Information of the Department of Analysis, Forecast and Strategic Planning. The following year, he became Deputy Head of Service - Head of the Operational Information Department of the Forecast Analysis and Strategic Planning Service.

Chief of FSB Fifth Service (2009)
As of 2009, Beseda headed the FSB Operational Information and International Relations Service (Fifth Service).

On 4 March 2010 when the Russian Interdepartmental Commission on the country's participation in the G8 was transformed into the Interdepartmental Commission on Russia's participation in both the G8 and G20, Beseda was included in the commission as representative of the FSB.

On the ground in Ukraine (2014)
On 20 and 21 February 2014, during the Ukrainian Maidan Revolution and shortly before the fall of President Viktor Yanukovych, Beseda was in Kyiv and in contact with the Security Service of Ukraine (SBU), officially tasked with determining the required level of protection for the Russian Embassy and other Russian institutions in the capital. Beseda asked for a meeting with President Yanukovich on the matter, but the request was rejected. On 4 April, during pre-trial investigation of the numerous killings of Ukrainian protesters in Kyiv from 18 to 22 February, the Ukrainian Ministry of Foreign Affairs asked Russia to clarify the circumstances of Beseda's stay in Ukraine.

On 26 July 2014, Beseda was included on the European Union's list of International sanctions during the Russo-Ukrainian War.

On 6 October 2014, Beseda signed an agreement on the mutual protection of classified information with Goran Matić, Director of Serbia's National Security Council and the Protection of Secret Information.

Fall from power and Lefortovo Prison (2022)
Amid President Putin's discontent with intelligence failures over the invasion of Ukraine which began on 24 February 2022, on 11 March investigative journalist Andrei Soldatov reported that Beseda and his deputy Anatoly Bolyukh were under house arrest.

As of 18 March, the Russian embassy had not responded to requests for comment on the report, but a U.S. official interviewed by The Wall Street Journal described the arrest report as "credible".

On 11 April, The Times of London reported that Beseda had been transferred to the infamous Lefortovo Prison, scene of mass executions during Stalin's purges. Soldatov speculated that Russian authorities may have suspected Beseda of having passed information to the CIA, amid reports afoot that Putin had purged 150 FSB careerists.

On 19 August, however, The Washington Post said that U.S. and other intelligence communities doubted that Beseda had been demoted or imprisoned, quoting "a senior US official" as saying, "We have pretty good reason to believe that he’s still in the job."

Family

Beseda has two sons, Anton and Aleksey.

References

External links
 Andrei Soldatov. Inside Vladimir Putin’s Shadowy Army of Global Spies. The Daily Beast, Aug. 29, 2021

1954 births
Living people
People of the Federal Security Service
Russian colonel generals
Russian individuals subject to the U.S. Department of the Treasury sanctions
Russian individuals subject to European Union sanctions
People of the 2022 Russian invasion of Ukraine
Inmates of Lefortovo Prison